René Willibrord Joseph Kager (born 17 July, 1957) is a Dutch linguist and Chair of English Linguistics and Phonology at Utrecht University. He is known for his works on phonology.

Career
Kager is a theoretical phonologist and works on child language acquisition. In his theoretical work he focuses on metric word stress and phonotactics in optimality theory and early perception of word prosodic properties such as tone, stress and rhythm, and segmental contrasts, in monolingual and bilingual infants. He is also involved in modeling aspects of phonological acquisition through artificial language learning studies. He has received several major national grants, including a VICI grant from the Netherlands Organization for Scientific Research (NWO) (2005-2010) on the role of phonotactics in speech segmentation. He is currently a Principal investigator in the Consortium on Individual Development.

Books
 Optimality Theory. Cambridge University Press. 1999

References

phonologists
Living people
Academic staff of Utrecht University
Linguists from the Netherlands
1957 births